Chak Alahi Bakhash is a village in Shaheed Bhagat Singh Nagar district of Punjab State, India. The village is administrated by Sarpanch an elected representative of the village.

Demography 
As of 2011, Chak Alahi Bakhash has a total number of 94 houses and population of 459 of which 240 include are males while 219 are females according to the report published by Census India in 2011. The literacy rate of Chak Alahi Bakhash is 86.80%, higher than the state average of 75.84%. The population of children under the age of 6 years is 65 which is 14.16% of total population of Chak Alahi Bakhash, and child sex ratio is approximately 757 as compared to Punjab state average of 846.

Most of the people are from Schedule Caste which constitutes 59.91% of total population in Chak Alahi Bakhash. The town does not have any Schedule Tribe population so far.

As per the report published by Census India in 2011, 149 people were engaged in work activities out of the total population of Chak Alahi Bakhash which includes 124 males and 25 females. According to census survey report 2011, 79.19% workers describe their work as main work and 20.81% workers are involved in Marginal activity providing livelihood for less than 6 months.

Education 
The village has a Punjabi medium, co-ed primary school founded in 1975. The schools provide mid-day meal as per Indian Midday Meal Scheme and the meal prepared in school premises. As per Right of Children to Free and Compulsory Education Act the school provide free education to children between the ages of 6 and 14.

B.K.M College of Education and Doaba Group Of Colleges are the nearest colleges.

Transport 

See also 
List of villages in India

References

External links 
 Tourism of Punjab 
 Census of Punjab
 Locality Based PINCode

Villages in Shaheed Bhagat Singh Nagar district